Matthew Raymond Burnett (born July 24, 1991) is a Canadian record producer, musical director and manager from Toronto, Ontario, Canada who has worked with a number of major recording artists in various genres from R&B to soul, hip hop and rap. Burnett has produced for the likes of Daniel Caesar, Drake, Eminem, Nas, Lil Wayne, Nicki Minaj, Chris Brown, Childish Gambino, Ellie Goulding and Snoh Aalegra to name a few. He has also musically directed Daniel Caesar, Charlotte Day Wilson, Jessie Reyez, Willow Smith and Queen Naija and currently manages both Caesar and Wilson alongside longtime music partner, Jordan Evans. Matthew Burnett's work has earned him two Grammy Award nominations and five Juno Award nominations. In 2018 he took home a Juno Award for R&B/Soul Recording of the Year for Caesar's debut studio album, Freudian.

Biography 
Burnett's tuneful ability became apparent at an early age. Starting piano lessons at just four years old, his music instructor noted his natural talent to play songs by ear. As he got older, Burnett's love of music would only grow stronger. By the time he was in ninth grade he was playing in a professional band around the city. Music production software FL Studio (formerly FruityLoops) would introduce him to the art of producing and recording his own music. A student of his craft, Burnett coupled his inherent passion with a fierce dedication to honing his skills, earning a Bachelor of Music degree from the Humber Institute of Technology and Advanced Learning in Toronto, Ontario, Canada.

In 2007, Burnett was introduced to Grammy Award-winning producer Matthew Samuels, known commonly as Boi-1da, thus beginning a mentorship that would change his life and career. Under Samuels’ guidance Burnett continued to hone his sound and technique, officially signing to Boi-1da Productions in 2010 where he and Evans would thrive as the production power-duo behind some of the biggest hits in hip hop and R&B. Notable among Burnett's earliest achievements was his production on “Not Afraid,” the lead single on rapper Eminem’s seventh studio album, Recovery, and the sixteenth song in Billboard history to debut at number one. The track earned Burnett a Grammy Award-nomination for “Best Rap Song” in 2011.

Ending his Boi-1da deal in 2013, Burnett and partner Evans moved on to cultivate Canadian R&B artist, Daniel Caesar. The two are the principal producers for Caesar's debut album, Freudian, which was nominated for two awards at the 60th Annual Grammys. Today, Burnett continues to lend his expertise in studio production, live show curation, musical direction and management to several of today's leading artists.

Artistry

Record production 
Production was Burnett's first love and a talent that catapulted him to success at a very early age. By just 21 years old, his unique ear led him to co-produce music for some of the industry's biggest names, including Drake, Eminem, Keri Hilson, Nas, Lil Wayne and DJ Khaled. Today, that list has expanded to include Daniel Caesar, Chris Brown, Nicki Minaj, Childish Gambino, Kelly Rowland, Jessie Reyez and Ellie Goulding. His sound and production style were heavily influenced by his Christian upbringing, taking inspiration from gospel music. As he matured, his musical style followed suit and took form through consistent experimentation, practice, and the tutelage of Boi-1da. Today, Burnett's work is unified across genres by a soulful, powerful sound.

Musical direction 
A producer at heart, Burnett's wheelhouse soon expanded to include not only studio production, but live show curation and musical direction. He is the visionary behind the live performances for singers Daniel Caesar, Charlotte Day Wilson, Jessie Reyez, Willow Smith, and Queen Naija among others. From composing musical arrangements to scouting, hiring and rehearsing their bands, Burnett is a conduit of creativity, building harmonies both in music and within the teams that create it.

Management 
Burnett currently serves alongside longtime music partner Jordan Evans as the co-manager to Grammy Award-winning artist, Daniel Caesar. They also co-manage fellow Canadian rising star, Charlotte Day Wilson. In partnership with Evans and Caesar, Burnett founded the independent record label Golden Child Recordings.

Discography

2010

Drake – Thank Me Later
06. "Up All Night" (featuring Nicki Minaj) 

Eminem – Recovery
07. "Not Afraid" 
08. "Seduction" 

Bun B – Trill OG
16. "It's Been a Pleasure" (featuring Drake) 

Lil' Wayne – I Am Not a Human Being
10. "Bill Gates" 

Drake – Unreleased single
"Something" 

Lloyd Banks – The Hunger For More 2
15. "Where I'm At" (featuring Eminem) 

Keri Hilson – No Boys Allowed
01. "Buyou Music" (featuring J. Cole) 
10. "Gimmie What I Want" 
16. "Fearless"

2011

DJ Khaled – We The Best Forever
08. "Can't Stop" (featuring Birdman and T–Pain) 

Mindless Behavior – #1 Girl
08. "Future" 

Down With Webster – Time to Win, Vol. 2
07. "I Want It All"

2012

Childish Gambino – Royalty
16. "Wonderful" (featuring John Osho) 

Nas – Life Is Good
19. "Trust" 

Busta Rhymes – Year of the Dragon
09. "Sound Boy" (featuring Cam'ron) 

2 Chainz – Based on a T.R.U Story
01. "Yuck" (featuring Lil Wayne) 

Slaughterhouse – Welcome to Our House
13. "Goodbye" 

Talib Kweli – Attack The Block
06. Outstanding (featuring Ryan Leslie) 

Nicki Minaj – Pink Friday: Roman Reloaded – The Re–Up
02. "Freedom" 

Game – Jesus Piece
09. "See No Evil" (featuring Kendrick Lamar and Tank)

2013

Kelly Rowland – Talk a Good Game
09. "Red Wine" 

Rich Gang – Rich Gang
01. "R.G." (featuring Mystikal) 

Lil Wayne – Dedication 5
12. "Live Life" (featuring Euro) 

Audio Push – Come as You Are
09. "Turn Down" 

Drake – Nothing Was the Same
13. "Pound Cake" 

Doley Bernays – Just In Case
06. "Drown" 

Fabolous – The Soul Tape 3
07. "You Know" (featuring Young Jeezy)

2014

Eric Bellinger – The Rebirth
06. "Delorean" 

Zuse – Bullet
11. "Oiler" (featuring Trae The Truth) 

Sebastian Mikael – Speechless
04. "Made For Me" (featuring Teyana Taylor) 

G–Eazy – These Things Happen
05. "Opportunity Cost" 

Game – Blood Moon: Year of the Wolf
02. "F.U.N."
06. "Married To The Game" (featuring French Montana, Dubb and Sam Hook) 

Astro – Computer Era
10. "N*gga Pls" 

Jahkoy – Forward Thinking

 08. "Vacay" 

OB O'Brien – "Schemin' Up" Single

 "Schemin' Up"

2015

Kyndall – Still Down EP
02. "All Mine" 

Raekwon – Fly International Luxurious Art
13. "Worst Enemy" (featuring Liz Rodrigues) 

Daniel Caesar – Pilgrim's Paradise
02. "Death and Taxes" 
03. "Paradise" 
05. "Streetcar" 
06. "Show No Regret" 

KYLE – Smyle
10. "Remember Me?" (featuring Chance The Rapper) 

Chris Brown – Royalty
06. "Zero" 

Various artists – Magic Mike XXL Original Motion Picture Soundtrack

 08. "Untitled (How Does It Feel)"

2016

June's Diary – "All of Us" Single
 "All of Us" 

Audio Push – 90951
04. "Spread Love" 

Daniel Caesar – Get You – Single

 '"Won't Live Here" (produced with Jordan Evans)
 "Get You" (produced with Jordan Evans)
 "Japanese Denim" (produced with Jordan Evans)

Nathan Sykes – Unfinished Business
09. "Give It Up" (featuring G–Eazy) 

Ellie Goulding – Single

 "Just in Case" (produced with Jordan Evans)

PartyNextDoor – TBD

 "You Made It" (produced with Jordan Evans)
11:11 - 11:11 (Executive producer with DZL)

 01. "West Side" 
 02. "You" 
 03. "Byo"
 04. "I'm Good" 
 05. "My Bish" 
 06. "Henny & Gin" 
 07. "Don't Worry"

2017

Joyner Lucas – 508-507-2209
09. "Way To Go" (featuring Snoh Aalegra) 

Chris Brown – Heartbreak on a Full Moon

 41. "Reddi Whip" (produced with Jordan Evans)

Daniel Caesar – Freudian (Executive producer with Jordan Evans)

 01. "Get You" (feat. Kali Uchis) 
 02. "Best Part" (feat. H.E.R) 
 03. "Hold Me Down" (produced with Alex Ernewein and Riley Bell)
 04. "Neu Roses (Transgressor's Song)" 
 05. "Loose" (produced with and Alex Ernewein)
 06. "We Find Love" (produced with and Jordon Manswell)
 07. "Blessed" 
 08. "Take Me Away" (feat. Syd) (produced with Riley Bell)
 09. "Transform" (feat. Charlotte Day Wilson) (produced with Alex Ernewein and Riley Bell)
 10. "Freudian" (produced with and Riley Bell)

2018 
Jessie Reyez feat. Daniel Caesar – Single

 "Figures, a Reprise" (produced with Jordan Evans)
Daniel Caesar – Single

 "Who Hurt You?" (co-produced with Jordan Evans)

2019 
Snoh Aalegra – Ugh, Those Feels Again

 06. “Toronto” (produced with Riley Bell)

Daniel Caesar – Case Study 01 (Executive producer with Jordan Evans and Daniel Caesar)

 02. "Cyanide" (produced with Jordan Evans)
 03. "Love Again" (feat. Brandy) (produced with Jordan Evans)
 05. "Open Up" (produced with Jordan Evans)
 06. "Restore the Feeling" (feat. Sean Leon and Jacob Collier) (produced with Jordan Evans)
 08. "Too Deep to Turn Back" (produced with Jordan Evans and River Tiber)

2020 
Fousheé – Single

 "Single AF" (produced with Solomonophonic)

2021 
Dylan Sinclair - Single

 "Black Creek Drive" (produced with Jordan Evans and Zachary Simmonds)

2022 
Daniel Caesar - Single

 "Please Do Not Lean" (produced with Jordan Evans and BADBADNOTGOOD)

Giveon - Give or Take

 "dec 11th" (produced with Jordan Evans)

Tours (musical direction)

TV and live performances (musical direction)

Awards and nominations

Grammy Awards

Juno Awards

Canadian Film Screen Awards

References

External links
 Matthew Burnett on Twitter
 Sit Down with Matthew Burnett & Jordan Evans via JahmalGittens.com
 Matthew Burnett & Jordan Evans Talk Producing “Pound Cake” For Drake & JAY Z

1991 births
Living people
Musicians from Toronto
Black Canadian musicians
Canadian hip hop record producers